The Mian people (Mianmin) are a people living in the Telefomin district of the Sandaun province in Papua New Guinea. The number of Mian is 3,500, based on the number of speakers of their language, Mian.

The Mian are living in small villages in mountainous areas with rainforest and rivers; conditions which makes transport very limited, almost only restricted to walking, which however have helped them retaining their traditional way of life, based on hunting and agriculture, including slash-and-burn. They grow sweet potatoes, sago, bananas, pineapples, breadfruits, pawpaw, sugarcanes, pumpkins and squashes, and in more recent times, also oranges, tomatoes, beans, peanuts and coconuts. Animals they hunt and catch include pigs, cassowaries, birds, fish, snakes and small reptiles. Hunting is exclusively for men, while the women are normally the ones preparing the food.

References

Digital resources 

Ethnic groups in Papua New Guinea
Min peoples